Self Help (published as Pravda in the US) is a novel by English author Edward Docx, published in 2007 by Picador; it won Geoffrey Faber Memorial Prize that year and was also long-listed for the Man Booker Prize. The novel has received positive reviews, his description of cities being compared to both Dickens and Dostoevsky.

Plot introduction
"Alone in her native St. Petersburg, Maria Glover sends an urgent summons to London and New York. Her son and daughter arrive too late to see her". Their mother's death marks the beginning of the twins search for the truth about her...

References

External links
Author's Webpage, Self Help/Pravda
Interview with author
Links to multiple reviews of Self Help by Edward Docx.

2007 British novels
English novels
Novels set in Saint Petersburg
Picador (imprint) books